Lemurian is the second full-length album by Nottingham based artist Lone, released on August 4, 2008. The album has been described as "shimmering, sun-drenched, and hazy" by a reviewer. When asked about the album's "summery" feel, Lone said "I knew I wanted to make music that sounded kind of warped, but it wasn't until I'd made loads of tracks that it started taking shape, and getting this summery feel. I didn't really set out for it to be a summery sounding record." Lone has been quoted as saying that one of the hardest things about making the album, for him, was choosing the track listing.

Track listing
 "Koran Angel" – 1:02
 "Cali Drought" – 3:17
 "Interview At Honolulu" – 3:51
 "Banyan Drive" – 2:37
 "Green Sea Pageant" – 1:08
 "Girl" – 3:13
 "Orange Tree" – 0:49
 "Maya Codex" – 2:04
 "Atoll Mirrored" – 1:15
 "Sea Spray" – 3:52
 "Under Two Palms" – 1:32
 "Lens Flare Lagoon" – 3:10
 "Borea" – 3:30
 "Buried Coral Banks" – 0:54
 "Phthalo Blue" – 3:36
 "Sunken" – 2:01
 "Minor Suns" - 2:48

References

2008 albums
Lone (musician) albums